R578 road may refer to:
 R578 road (Ireland)
 R578 road (South Africa)